The 2023 WWE Hall of Fame is an upcoming professional wrestling event to be produced by WWE that will feature the induction of the 24th class into the WWE Hall of Fame. The ceremony will take place on March 31, 2023, at the Crypto.com Arena in Los Angeles, California, the night preceding WrestleMania 39. It will air live at 10pm Eastern Time on Peacock in the United States and the WWE Network internationally, immediately after the airing of WWE's regular Friday night program, SmackDown.

Background
OnThe 2023 WWE Hall of Fame is scheduled to be held on March 31, 2023, at the Crypto.com Arena in Los Angeles, California, the night before WrestleMania 39. It will air live at 10pm Eastern Time on Peacock in the United States and the WWE Network internationally, immediately after the airing of WWE's regular Friday night program, SmackDown.  On March 10, 2023, Rey Mysterio was announced as the first individual inductee for the WWE Hall of Fame Class of 2023. On March 15, 2023, The Great Muta was announced as the second individual inductee for the WWE Hall of Fame Class of 2023 by Ric Flair. On March 20, 2023, Andy Kaufman, known for his feud with Jerry "The King" Lawler, was announced as the third inductee.

Inductees

Individual
 Class headliners appear in boldface

Celebrity

References

2023 in professional wrestling
2023 in the United States
Events in Los Angeles
WWE Hall of Fame ceremonies